Patham Nilayile Theevandi (English: Train in the Tenth Floor) is a 2009 Malayalam film directed by Joshy Mathew. It stars Innocent, Jayasurya and Meera Nandan in pivotal roles. Chenda artist Mattannoor Sankarankutty composed music for the film. The film was a box office failure.

Plot 
The film tells the story of Sankara Narayanan, a 55-year-old gangman from the Indian Railways. From his teenage days onward he was afraid of the strange voices that talked to him incessantly. To escape the fear, he seeks refuge in alcohol, alienating himself from his family and ending up in an asylum. His son Ramu could never sympathise with a father who had shirked his responsibility as a husband and a father. But Narayanan starts writing letters from the asylum, to which Ramu doesn't even bother to reply. A young doctor tries to help Sankara Narayanan, for he knows that he can be cured. The doctor not only intends to reunite Narayanan with his family but also has something very important to reveal to Ramu.

Cast 
 Innocent as Sankara Narayanan
 Jayasurya as S.Ramanadhan (Ramu)
 Anoop Menon as Dr. John Mathai
 Meera Nandan as Indu
 Vijayaraghavan as Ayyappan
 Sreekala as Sarojini
 Jagannathan as Sankaran's uncle
 Balachandran Chullikkad as Board member

Awards
Kerala Film Critics 2008 - Best Actor - Innocent

References

External links
 
 
 

2009 films
2000s Malayalam-language films